Stericta corticalis is a species of moth of the family Pyralidae. It is found in Papua New Guinea.

References

Epipaschiinae
Moths of Papua New Guinea
Moths described in 1900